KICT-FM (95.1 MHz) is a radio station in Wichita, Kansas broadcasting an active rock format.  The station is owned by SummitMedia.  Its studios are in Wichita and the transmitter is located outside Colwich, Kansas.

History
The station began as a country music station in the 1970s. It would adopt its current format on January 24, 1979, with the first song being "Rock & Roll Band" by Boston.

On July 30, 2014, it was announced that the E. W. Scripps Company would acquire Journal Communications in an all-stock transaction. The combined firm retained their broadcast properties and spun off their print assets as Journal Media Group. KICT-FM, their sister radio stations in the Wichita area and 2 TV stations were not included in the merge; in September, Journal filed to transfer these stations to Journal/Scripps Divestiture Trust (with Kiel Media Group as trustee). Scripps exited radio in 2018; the Wichita stations went to SummitMedia in a four-market, $47 million deal completed on November 1, 2018.

References

External links
 T-95 official website 
 T-95 Radio Live 

ICT-FM
Active rock radio stations in the United States
Radio stations established in 1970
1970 establishments in Kansas